A referendum on further privatisation of Zavarovalnica Triglav was held in Slovenia on 11 November 2007. The referendum would approve the Amending the Ownership Transformation of Insurance Companies Act, which would allow Kapitalska družba to sell its shares in Zavarovalnica Triglav. The proposal was rejected by 71.1% of voters.

Results

References

2007 referendums
Referendums in Slovenia
2007 in Slovenia
Privatisation referendums
Privatisation in Slovenia
November 2007 events in Europe